MV Spirit of Norfolk was an American passenger ship which operated as a tour boat out of Norfolk, Virginia, until destroyed by fire in June 2022.

Description 
Spirit of Norfolk was a  passenger ship built in Amelia, Louisiana in 1992 as hull number 163. It had three decks and was capable of accommodating over 400 passengers.

History 
Spirit of Norfolk was the second ship of its name. The first was launched in 1978 as a harbor cruising ship. However, it was not financially viable and operated for only four years. The second Spirit of Norfolk was launched and christened in March 1992. It was originally owned by Spirit Cruises LLC, which merged with Premier Yachts Inc. in 2007 to become Entertainment Cruises Inc., based in Chicago, Illinois.

In 2008, the vessel underwent a $350,000 renovation. It was painted blue and white to resemble the 1978 ship and the interior was updated. That year, the vessel hosted roughly 130,000 passengers. The vessel was renovated a second time in 2016, with a cost of $1.2 million. This renovation focused on the lounge areas, interactivity, and menu overhauls.

During the COVID-19 pandemic, Spirit of Norfolk remained at anchor for several months in 2020, and its number of staff was reduced by half. The ship was able to operate again beginning in April 2021, taking on passengers at 50% capacity. By June 2022 it was owned by Hornblower Cruises & Events of San Francisco, which acquired Entertainment Cruises in 2019.

Fire and loss 
On 7 June 2022, Spirit of Norfolk was conducting a harbor tour for elementary students off Naval Station Norfolk. A total of 108 people were aboard, 89 of them schoolchildren, when it caught fire in the early afternoon. The fire appeared to start in the engine room, with smoke seen coming from the stern of the ship. The crew moved all passengers to the weather deck and called for help, and the passenger ship Victory Rover pulled alongside Spirit of Norfolk, taking on its passengers. Two tugboats from Naval Station Norfolk also responded, pulling Spirit of Norfolk into the station's pier 4. Various agencies began fighting the fire on board the ship, including the Coast Guard, Norfolk Fire and Rescue, and neighboring fire stations. Efforts to contain the fire continued until 9 June, including dewatering operations to remove contaminated water aboard the ship. On 9 June, the fire was believed to be fully contained, but the vessel was declared a total loss.

By 12 June, the dewatering aboard the vessel was completed and it was declared safe to enter. The polluted water was pumped into a barge and no environmental contamination was detected. A salvage team consisting of two tugs and a Coast Guard escort successfully towed Spirit of Norfolk into a shipyard for investigation and salvage.

Public hearing 
On January 26, 2023, the United States Coast Guard and the National Transportation Safety Board began a joint public hearing into the fire and loss of the vessel. During these hearings, no exact cause of the fire was found, however it is believed that the origin of the fire was a leaky turbocharger, which ignited cardboard boxes placed directly below the engine it was installed in. During the hearing, 23 witnesses testified and 103 exhibits were created for public viewing. The hearing also revealed that the vessel did not have a fire detection system or a fire suppression system. On February 2 2023, the joint public hearings concluded.

As of February 9, 2023, the report of investigation regarding the findings of the hearing has not been publicly released.

References 

Ship fires
2022 fires in the United States
Passenger ships of the United States
1992 ships
Maritime incidents in 2022
Ships built in Louisiana